A drill tower is a tower and training facility for firefighters. It is usually built within a fire station facility for routine exercises and training.

Structure
A drill tower is a multi-level structure simulating high-rise buildings. Heights vary by location.

Use
Towers can help firefighters deal with real-life situations, including running upstairs with heavy equipment, using rope and safety nets, and operating a fire engine in a confined space.

See also
Buford Tower: historic example
Fire lookout tower
Hose tower

References

Firefighter training
Fire stations